Brunca is one of six socioeconomic regions of Costa Rica.

Brunca may also refer to:
Brunca (Bithynia), a town of ancient Bithynia
Boruca people
Boruca language
Brunca Sign Language